Roncalli may refer to:

 Circus Roncalli, German circus
 Roncalli (TV series), Germany television series

Schools 

 Roncalli High School (disambiguation), list of schools with the name
 Roncalli Catholic High School, school in Omaha, Nebraska
 Roncalli College, a secondary school in Timaru, New Zealand,

Family name 

 Cristoforo Roncalli, Italian painter
 Ludovico Roncalli, Italian composer
 Angelo Giuseppe Roncalli, Italian prelate, Pope John XXIII

Italian-language surnames